Luminosity is one of the largest yachts in the world, with a length of . The interior of the yacht was designed by Zaniz Jakubowski. Luminosity is one of the first yachts to feature a hybrid propulsion system, considered a more environmentally friendly than traditional diesel-powered boats. The yacht was built by Benetti in Livorno, Italy.

References 

Motor yachts
2020 ships